The ASEAN Charter is a constituent instrument of the Association of Southeast Asian Nations (ASEAN). It was adopted at the 13th ASEAN Summit in November 2007.

The intention to draft the Charter had been formally proposed at the 11th ASEAN Summit held in December 2005 in Kuala Lumpur, Malaysia. Ten ASEAN leaders, one from each member state, called the ASEAN Eminent Persons Group (EPG) were assigned to produce recommendations for the drafting of the charter.

At the 12th ASEAN Summit held in January 2007 in Cebu, the Philippines, several basic proposals were made public. ASEAN leaders agreed during the summit to set up a "high level task force on the drafting of the ASEAN Charter" composed of ten high level government officials from the ten member countries. The task force then held 13 meetings during 2007.

The Charter
Principles set out in the charter include:
 Emphasis on the centrality of ASEAN in regional co-operation.
 Respect for the principles of territorial integrity, sovereignty, non-interference and national identities of ASEAN members.
 Promoting regional peace and identity, peaceful settlements of disputes through dialogue and consultation, and the renunciation of aggression.
 Upholding international law with respect to human rights, social justice and multilateral trade.
 Encouraging regional integration of trade.
 Appointment of a secretary-general and permanent representatives of ASEAN.
 Establish a human rights body and an unresolved dispute mechanism, to be formalized at ASEAN Summits.
 Development of friendly external relations and a position with the UN (like the EU)
 Increasing the number of ASEAN summits to twice a year and the ability to convene for emergencies.
 Reiterating the ASEAN flag's use, anthem, emblem, and national ASEAN day on 8 August.

Enactment
The charter came into force in December 2008, thirty days after Thailand's delivery of the final instrument of ratification. Thailand's permanent representative to the United Nations, Ambassador Don Pramudwinai deposited the document with ASEAN Secretary-General, Surin Pitsuwan, at the Thai mission in New York on 14 November. He issued a statement saying, "This is certainly an occasion to celebrate for the 570 million people of ASEAN. This means that when the ASEAN leaders gather at their annual summit in mid December, the ASEAN Charter will have come into force." He referred to the charter coming into force after the 14th Summit in Chiang Mai, Thailand, from 13–18 December. In doing so he added that celebrations would follow not only for the full ratification of the charter but also the entering into force of the new basic law of ASEAN, "It will be a rules-based and people-oriented organization with its own legal personality".

Launch
On 15 December 2008, the members of ASEAN met in the Indonesian capital of Jakarta to launch the charter, signed in November 2007, with the aim of moving closer to "an EU-style community". The charter turned ASEAN into a legal entity and aimed to create a single free-trade area for the region encompassing 600 million people. Indonesian President Susilo Bambang Yudhoyono stated: "This is a momentous development...ASEAN is...transforming itself into a community. It is achieved while ASEAN seeks a more vigorous role in Asian and global affairs at a time when the international system is experiencing a seismic shift", he added, referring to climate change and economic upheaval. Southeast Asia is no longer the bitterly divided, war-torn region it was in the 1960s and 1970s".

The ongoing global financial crisis was identified as a threat to the goals envisioned by the charter. The most controversial part of the charter was the proposed human rights body, details of which were to be hammered out at the summit in February 2009. The body would not have the power to impose sanctions or punish countries that violate citizens' rights and would therefore be limited in effectiveness, this is said to be the effect of the ASEAN Charter saying that it is supposed to not interfere with local political issue of the member states.

See also
 Bandung Conference#Declaration - principles of non-interference

References

External links
 ASEAN Charter
 Framing the ASEAN charter: an ISEAS perspective

ASEAN laws
Political charters
Treaties concluded in 2007
Treaties entered into force in 2008
Treaties of Singapore
Treaties of Brunei
Treaties of Laos
Treaties of Malaysia
Treaties of Cambodia
Treaties of Vietnam
Treaties of Myanmar
Treaties of the Philippines
Treaties of Indonesia
Treaties of Thailand

Treaties establishing intergovernmental organizations
2007 in Singapore